Abu'l-Husayn al-Basri (died 436/1044) was a Mu'tazilite jurist and theologian. He wrote al-Mu'tamad fi Usul al-Fiqh (The Canon of the Foundations of Jurisprudence), a major source of influence in informing the foundations of Islamic jurisprudence until Fakhr al-Din al-Razi's al-Mahsul fi 'Ilm al-Usul (The Compilation of the Fundamentals of the Legal Sciences).

He was a physician as well as a disciple of the Mu'tazilite judge Abd al-Jabbar in Rey. He challenged some of his master's teachings and eventually compiled a huge (two volumes; 1500 pages) critical review of the arguments and proofs used in Islamic scholastic theology. This, he summarised in al-Mu'tamad and included a critique of the qualifications of a legist. His works were generally handed down among students of medicine,  and it was a century before his teachings were revived and espoused by the Mu'tazili scholar Ibn al-Malahimi in Khorezm in Central Asia, where they gained recognition as a school of Mu'tazili theology.

References

Madelung, W and Schmidtke, S (eds)  Abu-I-Husayn al-Basri's Mu'tazili Theology among the Karaites in the Fatimid Age BRILL Amsterdam September 2006 

Mu'tazilites
11th-century writers
Year of birth unknown
1044 deaths
11th-century Muslim scholars of Islam